The Broadway Tunnel was a tunnel under Fort Moore Hill in Downtown Los Angeles, California. It extended North Broadway (formerly Fort Street), at Sand Street (later California Street), one block north of Temple Street, northeast to the intersection of Bellevue Avenue (later Sunset Boulevard, now Cesar Chavez Avenue), to Buena Vista Street (now North Broadway).

History
A proposal for opening Broadway through to Buena Vista Street and extending the street south into what was then part of Main Street, below Tenth Street — to give a continuous, wide thoroughfare from the southern city limits to the Eastside — was made as early as February 1891.
 
Plans were prepared by the city engineer's office in early March 1895. The main argument for its construction was that a tunnel providing an additional opening on the north would lessen the constantly increasing traffic (horses, buggies and wagons), which was causing a dangerous jam at the corner of First and Spring Streets.

Construction
Work began on the Broadway Tunnel on November 2, 1899. About 25 men with teams (of animals) moved obstructions out of the way in preparation for the excavation, from the north approach. On the morning of January 20, 1900, a laborer was buried under about 20 tons of earth at the north end of the tunnel. The wood bracing fell over the man in such a manner that he was saved from being crushed to death.

The tunnel required more than 50,000 cubic yards (38 227.75 m3) of elevation, 4,000 cubic yards (3 058.22 m3) of concrete and 1.25 million of bricks to line it.
 
The Broadway Tunnel was completed and opened for traffic on Saturday, August 17, 1901. The cost in its construction was $66,000.

Reconstruction 
The Broadway Tunnel was closed for reconstruction in 1915. The roadway was lowered to decrease the grade, wood block flooring was installed to provide a noiseless surface for the traffic of teams and automobiles, and a false roof built inside the original shell.

The work was completed and the Broadway Tunnel reopened in early February 1916. Due to the importance of the artery of travel, through which thousands of automobiles, teams and pedestrians would be passing daily, an event was held on Saturday, February 19, formally turning the tunnel over to the city, with the Automobile Club of Southern California in charge.

Closure
The Broadway Tunnel was closed on June 2, 1949. It was demolished for the construction of the new Hollywood Freeway (U.S. Route 101) through Downtown. The route cut through Fort Moore Hill and made it necessary for a Broadway overpass to be built across the freeway at the former Broadway Tunnel site.

References

External links
Visit To Old Los Angeles; Broadway (Part 1) – Includes Map Showing Tunnel Site
 

 

Tunnels in Los Angeles
Road tunnels in California
Buildings and structures in Downtown Los Angeles
Demolished buildings and structures in Los Angeles
Demolished buildings and structures in California
History of Los Angeles
Streets in Los Angeles
Infrastructure completed in 1901
Buildings and structures demolished in 1949
1901 establishments in California
1948 disestablishments in California
20th century in Los Angeles